The River is the fifth studio album by American singer-songwriter Bruce Springsteen. It was released on October 17, 1980, by Columbia Records. Springsteen's only double album, The River was produced by Jon Landau, Springsteen, and bandmate Steven Van Zandt. The album was Springsteen's first to go number one on the Billboard Top LPs & Tape chart and spent four weeks at the top of the charts. "The River" was nominated for Best Rock Vocal Performance  at the 1982 Grammy Awards.

Background
The River included several tracks recorded in 1977. "Independence Day", "Point Blank", "The Ties That Bind", "Ramrod", and "Sherry Darling" were held over from his previous album, Darkness on the Edge of Town, and had been featured on the 1978 tour, as had parts of "Drive All Night" as a long interpolation within "Backstreets". "The River" was recorded in August 1979, and then performed live at the September 1979 Musicians United for Safe Energy concerts, gaining a featured spot in the subsequent documentary No Nukes.

Originally, Springsteen intended The River to be a single album, entitled The Ties That Bind. Springsteen had been working with the E Street Band at his home studio, Telegraph Hill Studios, which was actually a barn at his Holmdel, New Jersey property. By early August, there was an initial cut of 10 songs (recorded at the Power Station in New York City) and Columbia began to believe they might have a new Springsteen record in time for Christmas 1979. Bruce decided on a track sequence, and in September, Bob Clearmountain was brought in to mix twelve tracks. Springsteen signed off on The Ties That Bind, and the tapes were sent off for mastering on October 15. But when they came back, he suddenly cancelled the release, and went back to recording. He later said, "The songs lacked the kind of unity and conceptual intensity I liked my music to have." His manager and co-producer, Jon Landau, suggested that maybe this record needed to be a double album, in order to encompass everything Springsteen was trying to achieve. After another seven months at the Power Station, the sessions came to an end. The River was released on October 17, 1980, with 20 of the 50 songs that had been recorded.

Springsteen added darker material after he had written the title track. Indeed, The River became noted for its mix of the frivolous next to the solemn. This was intentional, and in contrast to Darkness, for as Springsteen said during an interview, "Rock and roll has always been this joy, this certain happiness that is in its way the most beautiful thing in life. But rock is also about hardness and coldness and being alone ... I finally got to the place where I realized life had paradoxes, a lot of them, and you've got to live with them."

The 1979 single album was eventually released as one of the discs in the 2015 box set release The Ties That Bind: The River Collection.

On November 8, 2009, at a concert, Bruce Springsteen spoke about the album, saying: "The River was a record that was sort of the gateway to a lot of my future writing. It was a record we made after Darkness on the Edge of Town. It was a record made during a recession—hard times in the States. Its title song is a song I wrote for my brother-in-law and sister. My brother-in-law was in the construction industry, lost his job and had to struggle very hard back in the late '70s, like so many people are doing today. It was a record where I first started to tackle men and women and families and marriage. There were certain songs on it that led to complete records later on: 'The River' sort of went to the writing on Nebraska, 'Stolen Car' went to the writing on Tunnel of Love. Originally it was a single record. I handed it in with just one record and I took it back because I didn't feel it was big enough. I wanted to capture the themes I had been writing about on Darkness. I wanted to keep those characters with me and at the same time added music that made our live shows so much fun and joy for our audience. So in the end, we're gonna take you down to The River tonight."

Reception and legacy 

In a contemporary review for Melody Maker, Paolo Hewitt compared listening to The River to "taking a trip through the rock 'n' roll heartland as you've never experienced it. It's a walk down all the streets, all the places, all the people and all the souls that rock has ever visited, excited, cried for and loved." Rolling Stone critic Paul Nelson deemed it "a rock & roll milestone" and said it possesses "weighty conclusions, words to live by" regarding "the second acts of American lives", conclusions "filled with an uncommon common sense and intelligence that could only have come from an exceptionally warmhearted but wary graduate of the street of hard knocks". 

The River was voted the second best album of 1980 in the Pazz & Jop, an annual poll of American critics nationwide, published by The Village Voice. Robert Christgau, the poll's supervisor, wrote of Springsteen in an accompanying essay, "All the standard objections apply—his beat is still clunky, his singing overwrought...but his writing is at a peak, and he's grown into a bitter empathy. These are the wages of young romantic love among those who get paid by the hour." In The New Rolling Stone Record Guide (1983), Dave Marsh called The River "by far Springsteen's most mature work, and arguably his most consistent". 

According to Jon Pareles of The New York Times, The River was the beginning of 1980s heartland rock. In 2003, Rolling Stone ranked it at number 250 on their list of the 500 Greatest Albums of All Time, then was re-ranked at number 253 in the 2012 revised list.

"Hungry Heart" was his first U.S. pop singles chart top ten hit single, reaching number five. (Springsteen had not intended the song to be for himself, having initially written it for The Ramones, but manager/producer/friend Jon Landau convinced him to keep it.) The album hit number one on the U.S. pop albums chart, a first for Springsteen, and sold 1.6 million copies in the U.S. between its release and Christmas. "Fade Away" reached number 20.

The album was followed by a lengthy tour of North America and Western Europe during 1980 and 1981. Since its release, The River has been certified quintuple platinum by the RIAA in the U.S., making it one of his best-selling albums, and his highest certified studio release after Born in the U.S.A. and Born to Run.

Track listing
All tracks are written by Bruce Springsteen.

Personnel
Credits adapted from the album's liner notes.

 Bruce Springsteen – vocals, electric 6- and 12-string guitars, harmonica, piano on "Drive All Night"
The E Street Band
Roy Bittan – piano, organ on "I'm a Rocker" and "Drive All Night", background vocals
 Clarence Clemons – saxophone, percussion, background vocals
 Danny Federici – organ
 Garry Tallent – bass guitar
 Steve Van Zandt – acoustic and electric guitars, lead guitar on "Crush on You", harmony vocals, background vocals
 Max Weinberg – drums

Additional vocals
 Flo & Eddie (Howard Kaylan and Mark Volman) – background vocals on "Hungry Heart"

Technical
 Bruce Springsteen, Jon Landau, Steve Van Zandt – production
 Neil Dorfsman – recording
 Chuck Plotkin, Toby Scott – mixing
Jeff Hendrickson, Garry Rindfuss, Dana Bisbee, Raymond Willhard, James Farber – engineering assistants
Jim Bauerlein – digital operator
Ken Perry – mastering
Jimmy Iovine – recording on "Drive All Night"
Bob Clearmountain – recording on "The Ties That Bind", mixing on "Hungry Heart"
Jimmy Wachtel – art direction and design, photography
 Frank Stefanko – cover photography, other photography
Joel Bernstein, Amanda Flick, David Gahr, Barry Goldenberg – photography

Charts

Weekly charts

Year-end charts

Certifications

References

External links

 The River (Adobe Flash) at Radio3Net (streamed copy where licensed)
 
 Album lyrics and audio samples

Bruce Springsteen albums
1980 albums
Albums produced by Steven Van Zandt
Columbia Records albums
Albums with cover art by Jimmy Wachtel
Albums produced by Jon Landau
Albums produced by Toby Scott